Stigmella sophorae is a moth of the family Nepticulidae. It is found in New Zealand.

The length of the forewings is about 3 mm. Adults have been recorded in February and from August to December. There is one generation per year.

The larvae feed on Sophora tetraptera and Sophora microphylla. They mine the leaves of their host plant. The mine starts in random loops and later fills all space between cuticles. There is one mine per leaflet, but adjacent leaflets are often occupied. The frass is green originally, but soon turns grey. Immature mines are paler green than the leaflet. Larva have been recorded from April to August. They are 2–3 mm long and pale green.

The cocoon is pale brown and attached to the stem of the host plant.

References

External links
Fauna of New Zealand - Number 16: Nepticulidae (Insecta: Lepidoptera)

Nepticulidae
Moths of New Zealand
Moths described in 1939